Austrostipa nodosa is a widespread species of grass found in Australia and New Zealand. Flowering occurs after rain.

References

External links

nodosa
Bunchgrasses of Australasia
Flora of New South Wales
Flora of Queensland
Flora of Victoria (Australia)
Flora of South Australia
Flora of the Northern Territory
Flora of Western Australia
Flora of Tasmania
Grasses of New Zealand